In molecular geometry, square pyramidal geometry describes the shape of certain compounds with the formula  where L is a ligand.  If the ligand atoms were connected, the resulting shape would be that of a pyramid with a square base. The point group symmetry involved is of type C4v.  The geometry is common for certain main group compounds that have a stereochemically-active lone pair, as described by VSEPR theory.  Certain compounds crystallize in both the trigonal bipyramidal and the square pyramidal structures, notably .

As a transition state in Berry pseudorotation
As a trigonal bipyramidal molecule undergoes Berry pseudorotation, it proceeds via an intermediary stage with the square pyramidal geometry.  Thus even though the geometry is rarely seen as the ground state, it is accessed by a low energy distortion from a trigonal bipyramid.

Pseudorotation also occurs in square pyramidal molecules. Molecules with this geometry, as opposed to trigonal bipyramidal, exhibit heavier vibration. The mechanism used is similar to the Berry mechanism.

Examples
Some molecular compounds that adopt square pyramidal geometry are XeOF4, and various halogen pentafluorides (XF5, where X = Cl, Br, I). Complexes of vanadium(IV), such as vanadyl acetylacetonate, [VO(acac)2], are square pyramidal (acac = acetylacetonate, the deprotonated anion of acetylacetone (2,4-pentanedione)).

See also
AXE method
Square pyramid
Hypervalent molecule
Molecular geometry

References

External links 
Chem| Chemistry, Structures, and 3D Molecules 
 Indiana University Molecular Structure Center
 Interactive molecular examples for point groups
 Molecular Modeling
 Animated Trigonal Planar Visual

Molecular geometry